Hobbema may refer to:

 Maskwacis, Alberta, Canada, an unincorporated community formerly named Hobbema
 Meindert Hobbema (1638–1709), a Dutch landscape painter
 SS Hobbema, Dutch cargo ship sunk in World War II